is a retired Japanese professional shogi player ranked 9-dan. He is a former Kisei and Kiō major title holder as well as a former director of the Japan Shogi Association.

Early life
Kiriyama was born on October 17, 1947, in Shimoichi, Nara. He learned how to play shogi when he was about five years old, and as a young boy played some instructional games against Kōzō Masuda during Masuda's frequent visits to the Nara area. In 1957, at the age of nine, Kiriyama moved to Tokyo to study shogi under Masuda as an uchi-deshi (a "live-in apprentice"), but became homesick and returned home after only a few months.

Kiriyama never lost his passion for shogi, however, and the following year he entered the Kansai branch of the Japan Shogi Association's apprentice school at the rank of 7-kyū under the guidance of shogi professional . He was promoted to the rank of 1-dan in 1963,and obtained full professional status and the rank of 4-dan in April 1966.

Shogi professional

Promotion history
Kiriyama's promotion history is as follows:
 7-kyū: 1958
 1-dan: 1963
 4-dan: April 1, 1966
 5-dan: April 1, 1969
 6-dan: April 1, 1960
 7-dan: April 1, 1973
 8-dan: April 1, 1975
 9-dan: October 9, 1984
 Retired: April 27, 2022

Titles and other championships
Kiriyama has appeared in major title matches a total of ten times and has won four titles. In addition to major titles, he has won seven other shogi championships during his career.

Major titles

Other championships

Note: Tournaments marked with an asterisk (*) are no longer held.

Awards and honors
Kiriyama has received numerous awards and honors throughout his career for his accomplishments in both on an off the shogi board. These include the Annual Shogi Awards given out by the JSA for performance in official games and other awards given out by governmental organizations, etc. for contributions made to Japanese society.

Annual shogi awards
2nd Annual Awards (April 1974March 1975): Best Winning Percentage
3rd Annual Awards (April 1975March 1976): Distinguished Service Award 
8th Annual Awards (April 1980March 1981): Fighting-spirit
10th Annual Awards (April 1982March 1983): Fighting-spirit
11th Annual Awards (April 1983March 1984): Most Games Won, Technique Award
12th Annual Awards (April 1984March 1985): Distinguished Service Award

Other awards
1988:  Shogi Honor Fighting-spirit Award (Awarded by JSA in recognition of winning 600 official games as a professional)
1990:  25 Years Service Award (Awarded by the JSA in recognition of being an active professional for twenty-five years)
2000:  Shogi Honor Fighting-spirit Award (Awarded by JSA in recognition of winning 800 official games as a professional)
2005:  40 Years Service Award (Awarded by the JSA in recognition of being an active professional for forty years)

Retirement
Kiriyama retired on April 27, 2022, at age 74. He finished with a career record of 996 wins and 958 losses.

JSA director
Kiriyama served on the Japan Shogi Association's board of directors as a director from 1976 until 1978.

Notes

References

External links
ShogiHub: Professional Player Info · Kiriyama, Kiyosumi [sic]

Japanese shogi players
Living people
Professional shogi players
Professional shogi players from Nara Prefecture
Kisei (shogi)
Kiō
1947 births
Retired professional shogi players